Plectrypops is a genus of soldierfish containing two extant species, with one species in the Indo-Pacific, and another in the western Atlantic and the Caribbean. They are red and reach a length of approximately 15 cm (6 in). Some members of this genus are also known from fossil remains.

Species
There are currently two recognized species in this genus:
 Plectrypops lima (Valenciennes, 1831) (Shy soldier)
 Plectrypops retrospinis (Guichenot, 1853) (Cardinal soldierfish)

See also

 Prehistoric fish
 List of prehistoric bony fish

References

Prehistoric ray-finned fish genera
Holocentridae
Marine fish genera
Taxa named by Theodore Gill